Pleurotomella esmeralda is an extinct species of sea snail, a marine gastropod mollusk in the family Raphitomidae.

Description

Distribution
Fossils of this marine species were found in Pliocene strata in Ecuador; age range:  5.332 to 3.6 Ma.

References

 Olsson, Axel Adolf. Neogene mollusks from northwestern Ecuador. Paleontological research institution, 1964.

External links
 Fossilworks.org: Pleurotomella esmeralda

esmeralda
Gastropods described in 1964